Richard H. Gallagher (November 17, 1927–September 30, 1997) was an American civil and aerospace engineer, researcher and president of Clarkson University from 1988 to 1995.

Early life and education 

Gallagher was born in Manhattan, New York City in 1927. After serving in the Navy during World War II, he studied civil engineering at New York University where he earned bachelor's and master's degrees.

Career 

After graduating from NYU, he worked for the Federal Aviation Administration and the Texas Company, before joining Bell Aerosystems in the Buffalo, New York area. There, he worked in aerospace structural analysis and eventually became the firm's assistant chief engineer.

Gallagher was a leader in developing methods for finite-element analysis  that utilized the capabilities of computers to design complex structures.  With his guidance, engineers and researchers at Bell expanded knowledge of "inelastic analysis, design optimization, composite materials analysis, linear fracture applications, thermal analysis methods, solid- and shell-element formulations, and the super-element substructuring technique."

During his time at Bell, Gallagher taught and studied for his doctorate at the State University of New York (SUNY)-Buffalo. He received the university's first engineering Ph.D. in 1966.

Once he received his doctorate, Gallagher soon became a full professor of civil engineering at Cornell University.

In 1978, he became dean of the engineering school at the University of Arizona, where he would again be a professor in residence after retiring from academic administration in 1995. In 1983, he was elected to the National Academy of Engineering. He joined the Worcester Polytechnic Institute in Massachusetts as provost in 1984.

From 1988 to 1995, Gallagher was president of Clarkson University, where he helped raise academic standards, found new engineering programs, construct new buildings, and doubled the university's endowment.

Publications 

His first book, A Correlation Study of Matrix Methods of Structural Analysis was published in 1964.

In 1973, he published Optimum Structural Design.

Gallagher was the author of Finite Element Analysis—Fundamentals, published in 1975. The book was translated into seven languages and sold 40,000 copies.

In 1979, he published Matrix Structural Analysis, with W. McGuire.

In total, Gallagher published 20 books and 120 papers.

He also founded the International Journal of Numerical Methods in Engineering, which he edited for 27 years.

Personal life 

Gallagher was married to the former Terese Doyle. He was survived by five children, all of whom were engineers: Mary Lee Rodin, Richard S. Gallagher, William J. Gallagher and Dennis M. Gallagher and John B. Gallagher.

Gallagher died of cancer at Northwest Hospital in Tucson, Arizona in 1997.

References

Members of the United States National Academy of Engineering
Worcester Polytechnic Institute faculty
University of Arizona faculty
Cornell University College of Engineering faculty
University at Buffalo alumni
New York University alumni
Clarkson University faculty
American civil engineers
American aerospace engineers
People from Manhattan
United States Navy personnel of World War II
1927 births
1997 deaths